John Hagart (19 November 1937 – 1 June 2010) was a Scottish football player and manager. He bossed Scottish sides Hearts and Falkirk during the later 1970s and early 1980s.

Hagart had a modest playing career, making only five senior league appearances for Berwick Rangers during the 1960–61 season. He also played in the junior leagues for Armadale Thistle.

Hagart was appointed manager of Heart of Midlothian on 12 October 1974 replacing Bobby Seith. After two seasons in the Premier Division the club was relegated, for the first time in its history, during the 1976–77 season. The side finished second bottom in the league with Hagart taking full responsibility and being dismissed on 23 April 1977.

Hagart signed up as Falkirk manager in 1979. He guided the then Division Two side to promotion in season 1979–80. Two mid-table finishes in the following seasons led to Hagart leaving in 1982.

A year later Hagart accepted the position of reserve team coach at Rangers working under then new manager Jock Wallace. He left along with Wallace when Graeme Souness arrived at the club.

References

External links
Manager profile at Hearts official website
Manager profile at Londonhearts.com
Obituary at Hearts official website

Scottish footballers
Berwick Rangers F.C. players
Scottish Football League players
Scottish football managers
Heart of Midlothian F.C. managers
Armadale Thistle F.C. players
Falkirk F.C. managers
Luton Town F.C. players
Rangers F.C. non-playing staff
2010 deaths
1937 births
Association football wing halves
Footballers from Edinburgh
Scottish Football League managers